Saranap (until 1913, Dewing Park) is a residential census-designated place (CDP) within central Contra Costa County, California. Lying at an elevation of 180 feet (55 m), it is bounded on the south and east by portions of Walnut Creek (including the gated senior residential development Rossmoor) and on the north and west by Lafayette. Saranap's ZIP code is 94595, but is addressed "Walnut Creek, CA" for delivery purposes as this is the postal designated city name used by residents. The community is in telephone area code 925. Saranap's population as of the 2010 census was 5,202.

Saranap has had numerous opportunities to be annexed as either part of Lafayette, or of Walnut Creek. These have been largely resisted by the occupants, whose land use is governed by county rules. These include the ability to keep small aviaries and bees, which can be highly restricted by law in surrounding cities, and in newer neighborhoods by restrictive covenants. As the local school district is independent of these city boundaries, and some of the cities impose additional parcel taxes, residents have little incentive to change the status quo. Only a minor addition was made to Lafayette from Saranap in recent decades, adding only one more street and being largely motivated by marginally superior housing values associated with the city of Lafayette.

Etymology
The community's name comes from an early 20th-century inter-urban commuter rail system. The local station, located near the intersection of Tice Valley Boulevard and Olympic Way,  was named after the railroad developer's mother, Sara Napthaly. This developer promoted the railroad to enhance the value of land developments, a process that led to a development pattern similar to a trolley car suburb, although in fact the railroad was a conventional regional rail line.

Geography

Demographics
The 2010 United States Census reported that Saranap had a population of 5,202. The racial makeup of Saranap was 4,275 (82.2%) White, 70 (1.3%) African American, 15 (0.3%) Native American, 451 (8.7%) Asian, 10 (0.2%) Pacific Islander, 113 (2.2%) from other races, and 268 (5.2%) from two or more races. Hispanic or Latino of any race were 437 persons (8.4%).

The Census reported that 5,176 people (99.5% of the population) lived in households, 11 (0.2%) lived in non-institutionalized group quarters, and 15 (0.3%) were institutionalized.

There were 2,173 households, out of which 706 (32.5%) had children under the age of 18 living in them, 1,097 (50.5%) were opposite-sex married couples living together, 194 (8.9%) had a female householder with no husband present, 74 (3.4%) had a male householder with no wife present.  There were 95 (4.4%) unmarried opposite-sex partnerships, and 27 (1.2%) same-sex married couples or partnerships. 634 households (29.2%) were made up of individuals, and 189 (8.7%) had someone living alone who was 65 years of age or older. The average household size was 2.38.  There were 1,365 families (62.8% of all households); the average family size was 2.98.

The population was spread out, with 1,192 people (22.9%) under the age of 18, 281 people (5.4%) aged 18 to 24, 1,367 people (26.3%) aged 25 to 44, 1,687 people (32.4%) aged 45 to 64, and 675 people (13.0%) who were 65 years of age or older.  The median age was 41.9 years. For every 100 females, there were 96.7 males.  For every 100 females age 18 and over, there were 91.6 males.

The homeowner vacancy rate was 0.9%; the rental vacancy rate was 4.1%.  3,764 people (72.4% of the population) lived in owner-occupied housing units and 1,412 people (27.1%) lived in rental housing units.

Education
Much of Saranap is in the Walnut Creek Elementary School District while some is in the Lafayette Elementary School District. All of Saranap is in the Acalanes Union High School District.

External links
 Google Map Centered at Tice Valley/Boulevard Way and Olympic Blvd., location of the original Saranap Station.

References

Census-designated places in Contra Costa County, California
Census-designated places in California